The James and Penninah Wrathall House, located at 5 N. Center St. in Grantsville, Utah, was built in 1898.  It was listed on the National Register of Historic Places in 2006.

Its NRHP nomination describes it as an "imposing" residence that is significant as "an unusual and well-preserved example of the Victorian style known as Queen Anne. The design shows the influence of design books, particularly in the Queen Anne and Eastlake details, but the execution by local builder, Charles Z. Schaffer, is unique."

References 

Houses on the National Register of Historic Places in Utah
Queen Anne architecture in Utah
Houses completed in 1898
Houses in Tooele County, Utah
National Register of Historic Places in Tooele County, Utah